The Lowe Files is a series on the A&E that looks at unsolved mysteries within the United States. The show is hosted by Rob Lowe and his sons John Owen Lowe and Edward Matthew Lowe.

Episodes
The series currently has aired 9 episodes. The series was cancelled after one season.

Season 1

References

 The Lowe Files review | The Hollywood Reporter
 The Lowe Files | Rotten Tomatoes
 The Lowe Files | History Channel
 Rob Lowe and sons bond on A&E's The Lowe Files | Insider
 Rob Lowe mystery reality series sets premiere date | Deadline
 Rob Lowe's mysterious new show with his sons | USA Today

External links
 
 

Paranormal reality television series
A&E (TV network) original programming
Cryptozoology
Alien abduction
Fear
Space